Cychrus daochengicus is a species of ground beetle in the subfamily of Carabinae. It was described by Deuve in 1989.

References

daochengicus
Beetles described in 1989